Old Homestead is a neighborhood on the east side of the Metro Detroit suburb of Southgate, Michigan. Usually, Old Homestead is bordered by Superior Street to the north, Eureka Road to the south, M-85 (Fort Street) to the east and either Trenton Road or Burns Street to the west. Commercial districts are located along Eureka Road and Fort Street and the rest of the neighborhood is mostly single-family homes, most of which were built during the 1940s and 1950s. The most common housing styles within Old Homestead consist of one-story ranch homes, one-and-a-half-story Cape Cods and two-story colonial revivals.

History
Old Homestead was originally platted in 1923 as a subdivision of Ecorse Township, however, for approximately the next two decades, it continued to remain mostly agricultural land. From this original plat, only four of the residential streets-Sycamore, Chestnut, Commonwealth and Superior Streets-retain their original names. In 1958, the remaining areas of Ecorse Township were incorporated as the city of Southgate-this included Old Homestead.

Education
Old Homestead residents are zoned to Fordline and Grogan Elementary Schools, Davidson Middle School and Southgate Anderson High School, none of which are in Old Homestead. Until the 2012-13 school year, Old Homestead residents were also zoned to Chormann Elementary School.

Before 1982, Old Homestead was zoned to Southgate High School (which became Southgate Anderson) in what was then the McCann school district. Before the opening of Southgate High School and the incorporation of Ecorse Township into Southgate, Old Homestead residents were served by Theodore Roosevelt High School in Wyandotte.

Public transportation
The Suburban Mobility Authority for Regional Transportation operates three bus routes along the borders of Old Homestead. Route #125 travels from Detroit Metropolitan Wayne County Airport along Eureka Road and Fort Street to River Rouge via Southland Center and during weekday rush hours continues into downtown Detroit. Route #160 travels along Eureka Road along the southern edge of Old Homestead, connecting it to Trenton, downtown Wyandotte, Wayne County Community College District's Downriver Campus and Southland Center. Route #830 is a weekday-rush-hour park and ride service that runs along Trenton Road in Old Homestead and connects Trenton and downtown Detroit.

References

External links
 Original Old Homestead plat

1923 establishments in Michigan
Populated places established in 1923
Neighborhoods in Michigan
Southgate, Michigan